Lima Mall is an enclosed shopping mall in American Township, Ohio. It is currently anchored by JCPenney with three vacant anchors last occupied by Elder-Beerman, Macy's, and Sears. The center is owned by Washington Prime Group, who took ownership after Simon Property Group spun off the property into a separate company, Washington Prime Group (the previous name of WP Glimcher).

History
Lima Mall first opened in 1965. Originally 166,000 square feet in size, the mall was one of the first smaller, regional centers built by Edward J. DeBartolo, Sr. Lazarus was added as an anchor in 1971. Another anchor, a local department store called The Leader, was sold to Elder-Beerman in the mid-1970s. An F. W. Woolworth Company store closed at the mall in mid-1997. The Lazarus store became Lazarus-Macy's in 2003, then dropped the Lazarus name in 2005.
 
In January 2013, Old Navy moved from its existing store to a space previously occupied by New York & Company, with The Shoe Department Encore replacing Old Navy's former store. On October 21, 2015, parent company The Bon-Ton announced that it would close the Elder-Beerman in the mall in January 2016.

Over the years, the Lima Mall has seen many changes. The focal point of the mall in years past was a large stone fountain which was in the center of the mall and there was also a small fountain in front of Elder-Beerman. These fountains were removed in the late 1990s. The mall also used to be home to many local events such as the annual home show, family fun fair, farm show, and car show. These events drew in thousands of people, but unfortunately are no longer activities held on the premises. The MCL cafeteria also used to be a landmark in the Lima Mall. This was a family dining place that saw much of its business on Friday and Saturday nights. Once again, it is another place that no longer is in business at the Lima Mall. Changing times, technology, and tastes have contributed to many of these past treasures no longer being around.

MC Sports closed in 2017 due to bankruptcy.

On May 31, 2018, Sears announced that its store would also be closing in as part of a plan to close 78 stores nationwide. The store closed on September 2, 2018.

On December 22, 2020, Macy's announced that they would be closing their location at Lima Mall on March 21, 2021 as part of a plan to close 46 stores nationwide which left JCPenney as the only anchor left.

References

External links
Official website

Washington Prime Group
Shopping malls in Ohio
Shopping malls established in 1965
Buildings and structures in Lima, Ohio